The 2014 AIBA Youth World Boxing Championships were held in Sofia, Bulgaria, from 10 to 25 April 2014. The competition is under the supervision of the world's governing body for amateur boxing  AIBA and is the junior version of the World Amateur Boxing Championships. The competition was open to boxers born in 1996 and 1997. This was a qualifying tournament for the 2014 Summer Youth Olympics.

Medal summary

Men

Women

Medal table

See also
 World Amateur Boxing Championships

Notes
A  AIBA terminated Indian Boxing Federation, but sportsmen could participate in international events under the AIBA flag.

References

Youth World Amateur Boxing Championships
Youth, 2014
2014 in Bulgarian sport
International boxing competitions hosted by Bulgaria
Sports competitions in Sofia
April 2014 sports events in Europe
2010s in Sofia